Rosalys is an illustrator, author, publisher, videographer and translator.

Career

Rosalys is a graphic artist whose creativity takes its roots at her French culture, her Chinese origins and her passion for Japan. Author-illustrator of a dozen of artbooks, comic books and children's books, she portrays a positive and colorful universe, marked by lyricism and femininity.

She is a professional artist since 2008 with the artist name "Rosalys". She was also known as "SaturnAlice" from 1999 to 2007, period when she published manga and illustrations in various dōjinshi.

In 2012, she founds and runs the publishing house Univers partagés editions. Faithful to the messages she try to convey as an artist, as an Art Director she establishes the editorial line to release books that are designed to encourage all those who have never forgotten their dreams.

In 2015, she runs her YouTube channel. Thus expanding her ways of expression, she puts her visual and pedagogical creativity to sharing messages that matter and cultural discovery.

In 2020, she is enthusiastic about a bright manga, about communication between people, and becomes the translator for the French edition. The translation, from Japanese to French, is added to her creative activities as an author-illustrator and YouTuber, all carried out in parallel.

Novel
Le voyage de Hana, dans un autre monde – tome 1 – Harry sur l'île aux animaux tranquilles, Rosalys, Univers partagés éditions, 2021. .
Le voyage de Hana, Stories – tome 1 – Anecdotes au soleil levant, Rosalys, Univers partagés éditions, 2020. .
Le voyage de Hana – tome 3 – Fraisie au pays des wagashi, Rosalys, Univers partagés éditions, 2019. .
Le voyage de Hana – tome 2 – Floraison des cerisiers au Japon, de Tōkyō à Kyōto, Rosalys, Univers partagés éditions, 2018. .
 Le voyage de Hana - tome 1 - Premier envol vers le Japon : destination Tōkyō, Rosalys, Univers partagés editions, 2017.

Artbooks
 Gourmandises japonaises, Rosalys, Univers partagés editions, 2015. 
 Princesses & Lolitas, Rosalys, Booklight editions, 2011. 
 Cute flowers, Rosalys, BD associées editions,  2009.

Coloring books
 Le voyage de Hana Coloriage, Rosalys, Univers partagés editions, 2022. 
 Gourmandises japonaises Coloriage, Rosalys, Univers partagés editions, 2015.

Collective artbooks
 Drakaina : Masters, Collective, SQP publishing, 2010.

Children's books
 [http://univers-partages.org/editions/divines/ Divines, Les beautés de la mythologie classique'], Rosalys (texts), Fleur D. (illustrations), Univers partagés editions, 2012. 
 Fraisie, la magie de la pâtisserie, Rosalys, Univers partagés editions, 2012. 
 フレジー、お菓子の魔法, Japanese version of Fraisie, la magie de la pâtisserie, Univers partagés editions, 2012. 
 Berrie, the Magic of Pastry, English version of Fraisie, la magie de la pâtisserie, Univers partagés editions, 2012. 
 Toujours près de mon coeur, Rosalys (texts), Laure Phelipon (illustrations), Samsara editions, 2011. 
 Un conte pour la Lune, Clementine Ferry (texts), Rosalys (illustrations), Chouetteditions,  2011. 
 J'aime *, Rosalys, Poisson Borgne editions, 2010. 
 Mon amie, Honorine la souris, Laetitia Etienne (texts), Rosalys (illustrations), Chouetteditions,  2010. 
 My little friend Honorine, English version of Mon amie, Honorine la souris, Chouetteditions,  2010.
 Rêves de lapinou, Rosalys (texts), Sandrine Fourrier (illustrations), Chouetteditions,  2010. 

Collective children's books
 Mes jolies histoires de princesses, Collective, Hemma editions, 2020. 
 Les princesses et moi tome 4, Collective, Hemma editions, 2016. 
 16 histoires de belles princesses, Collective, Hemma editions, 2011. 

Manga/comic books
 Workaholic, Morgan Magnin (author), Rosalys (illustrations), Univers Partagés editions, 2012. 
 Workaholic English edition, English version of Workaholic, Univers Partagés editions, 2012. 
 Fly for fun (adaptation of the MMORPG Flyff), Rosalys, Foolstrip editions in partnership with Gala Networks,  2008-2009. 

 Dōjinshi 

 Happy life in Japan #1.0, 2015.
 JolieCure, 2014.
 Uni, 2011.
 Chibi three, 2000.
 Usa-usa, 1999.

Participations, collective fanzines
 Paris-Kyoto, 2020.
 Tribute to Tsukasa Hôjô, 2010.
 Tribute to CLAMP, 2009.
 Yamano-world, 2005.
 White & black galerie, 2004.
 PlayElf, 2004.
 Mizono, 2000.

 Collections of illustrations 

 Fruits & couleurs, 2010, series of paintings on canvas paper for exhibition Rosalys, 33 x 41 cm
 Langage of flowers, 2010, series of digigraphies for exhibition Rosalys, 30 x 30 cm
 Zodiac signs, 2010, series of digigraphies for exhibition Rosalys at La Gallery Montreal, 30 x 30 cm
 Lolita, 2010, series of fine art prints for collective exhibition with Poisson Borgne editions, 21 x 29,7 cm
 Dark hair, 2009, series of acrylic paintings for exhibition Rosalys, 46 x 55 cm

 Translation of manga A Sign of Affection – tome 1, suu Morishita, Rosalys, Akata editions, 2021..A sign of affection – tome 2, suu Morishita, Rosalys, Akata editions, 2021..A sign of affection – tome 3, suu Morishita, Rosalys, Akata editions, 2021..A sign of affection – tome 4, suu Morishita, Rosalys, Akata editions, 2021..A sign of affection – tome 5'', suu Morishita, Rosalys, Akata editions, 2022..

References

External links
 
  Video interview by Total Manga
  Interview in the newspaper Presse Océan
  Interview in the newspaper 20minutes

Artist authors
Writers who illustrated their own writing
French children's book illustrators
French children's writers
French women illustrators
French illustrators
21st-century illustrators of fairy tales
French comics artists
French female comics artists
French women painters
French women children's writers
Feminist artists
Pseudonymous artists
Living people
French people of Chinese descent
21st-century French women artists
Year of birth missing (living people)